Alfredo Milani (6 January 1924 – 30 November 2017) was an Italian Grand Prix motorcycle road racer. His best year was in 1951 when he won two Grand Prix races and finished second to Geoff Duke in the 500cc world championship. Milani rode for the Gilera factory for his entire career.

References

1924 births
2017 deaths
Sportspeople from the Metropolitan City of Milan
Italian motorcycle racers
350cc World Championship riders
500cc World Championship riders